Yizhou is the name of an island, commonly identified as Taiwan, described in the account of an expedition undertaken by the Eastern Wu dynasty of China in AD 230. 90 percent of the sailors died on the voyage but the survivors still managed to kidnap "several thousand" natives, probably Taiwanese aborigines.

References

History of Taiwan
Eastern Wu